Tornos scolopacinaria, the dimorphic gray, is a species of geometrid moth in the family Geometridae. It is found in North America.

The MONA or Hodges number for Tornos scolopacinaria is 6486.

The male's wings are grayish-brown with a dark round discal spot on the fore wing.  The female's wings are mainly yellowish-gray with dark gray outer margins.  The female has a dark fore wing discal spot which is larger than the male's.  Both sexes have a checkered fringe.  The wingspan measures 2.1 to 2.9 cm. The moth flies from February to November.

The moths are known to use species of aster and tickseed plants as hosts.

Subspecies
These three subspecies belong to the species Tornos scolopacinaria:
 Tornos scolopacinaria forsythae Rindge, 1954 c g
 Tornos scolopacinaria scolopacinaria g
 Tornos scolopacinaria spodius Rindge, 1954 c g
Data sources: i = ITIS, c = Catalogue of Life, g = GBIF, b = Bugguide.net

Gallery

References

Further reading

External links

 

Boarmiini
Articles created by Qbugbot
Moths described in 1858